The Volkswagen Golf Plus is a car that was manufactured by Volkswagen between 2004 and 2014. As a five-seater compact MPV (C-segment), it was developed as a taller alternative to the Golf hatchback and positioned below the seven-seater Touran in Volkswagen's product catalogue, the vehicle is based on the Golf Mk5, riding on the PQ35 platform. An alternative appearance package was sold as the Volkswagen CrossGolf in 2006. Throughout its life cycle, it has been sold alongside the Golf Mk5 and Golf Mk6.

In 2014, the Golf Plus was replaced by the MQB-based Golf Sportsvan.

Overview 

The Golf Plus was presented to the public at the Bologna Motor Show in December 2004. It is  taller than the Golf Mk5, and  shorter than the three-row Touran. It offers higher seating position, and more space in the cabin with an extra 50 litres of boot space at 395 litres, which is expandable to 505 litres by lowering the boot floor. The rear seats can slide by 160 mm and folded in a new system, resulting in an almost level luggage space when folded. It also split 60:40, with the middle seat doubling as a fold-down drink table.

Many parts of the Golf Mk5 were also used in the Golf Plus, such as engines, transmissions, headrests and exterior mirrors. In contrast to the normal Golf, standard LED rear lights were used in the Golf Plus, the first in the C-segment.

Facelift 
In December 2008, the facelifted version was revealed at the Bologna Motor Show, featuring a revised front end which seen the introduction of the horizontally aligned band front grille and new headlights with daytime running lights, aligning its styling to the Golf Mk6. The revised variant went on sale in early 2009. It retains a largely similar design of the rear end and the interior. For the first time on the Golf Plus, a parallel parking assistance system called ParkAssist was be offered. A rear-view camera mounted behind the Volkswagen badge was also available as an option.

CrossGolf 
At the 2006 Paris Motor Show, Volkswagen released the CrossGolf which is a version of the Golf Plus with black-plastic body cladding and slightly increased ride height. Part of the Volkswagen Cross family which also includes the CrossPolo and CrossTouran, it was developed by the Volkswagen Individual division, which also developed the Golf R32.

In the UK, this model is badged as Golf Plus Dune and sold with the 1.9 TDI outputting .

The facelifted model was introduced in February 2010 at the Geneva Motor Show.

Powertrain 
All diesel engines are equipped with a diesel particulate filter (DPF).

For efficiency, the BlueMotion model received changes in engine tuning such as lowering the idling RPM. The third, fourth and fifth gears of the transmission have a longer gear ratio.

Sales

References

External links 

Golf Plus
Cars introduced in 2004
2010s cars
Compact MPVs
Hatchbacks
Euro NCAP small MPVs
Front-wheel-drive vehicles
Flexible-fuel vehicles